Swaranjit Singh is a City Councilman of Norwich, Connecticut. He was elected in 2021 and was the first Sikh councilman in Connecticut. Prior to being a City Councilman, he was a Board of Education Member. Swaranjit runs a business in Connecticut with his family. He has also been honored by the FBI with a Community Leadership Award, prior to being a councilman.

References

American Sikhs
Punjabi people
Politicians from Norwich, Connecticut

Year of birth missing (living people)
Living people